"Fathoms Below" is the opening song from the 1989 animated Disney feature film The Little Mermaid. It is 1:41 minutes in length, while the version in the musical is about twice as long, with additional lyrics written by Glenn Slater.  The song is written by Alan Menken and Howard Ashman, sung by the Ship's Chorus, and was featured on the album The Little Mermaid - An Original Walt Disney Records Soundtrack.

The song later made a brief appearance in the sixteenth episode of the fourth season of Once Upon a Time, sung by a teenaged Ursula during a flashback.

Production
Ashman decided to structure the opening sequence as an underwater montage, and so along with Menken wrote the song "Fathoms Below". The song was severely cut in size as Jeffrey Katzenberg that thought in a film, unlike a Broadway show, audiences would be unwilling to watch a lengthy opening number. The extended sequence was meant to show that Ursula is King Triton's sister. The storyboarded and pencil animation of this can be found on YouTube.

The song is featured in the Disneyland attraction Electric Water Pageant.

Synopsis
The "ship full of sailors first came onto the stage in the “Fathoms Below” number", and they sing about the mysteriousness of the deep blue sea, and mythical stories of the merfolk, such as "look out lad, a mermaid be waiting for you". The song it introduces the film and the legend of the merfolk from the perspective of sailors reciting to Prince Eric and foreshadows the love story between Ariel and Prince Eric.

Composition
The song is a "rousing sea chanty".

Reception
Filmtracks wrote that "of the seven songs in "The Little Mermaid", the first two Fathoms Below and Daughters of Triton are weaker ensemble pieces that cannot compete with the lengthier production numbers that follow". In regard to the former song, the site added "The working voices of 'Fathoms Below' are strong both in their representation of the sailors and in their recording quality. Had this song been expanded for the film as it would be for the Broadway show, it could have been a hit." While describing the film's album as "flat and dull", it noted "Only the vocals in "Fathoms Below" and some of the percussion in "Jig" seem to exhibit a three-dimensional sound".

Reviewing the Broadway musical, Variety wrote "“Under the Sea” would have been a more obvious scene-setting opener than the ho-hum sea chanty “Fathoms Below,” expanded from a few throwaway bars in the film".

References

1989 songs
Songs with music by Alan Menken
Songs with lyrics by Howard Ashman
Songs from The Little Mermaid (franchise)
Disney Renaissance songs
Song recordings produced by Alan Menken
Song recordings produced by Howard Ashman